Arneckeville is an unincorporated community in DeWitt County, in the U.S. state of Texas.

History
The first settlement at Arneckeville was made in 1859 by U. Barbara Arnecke and others. The community was originally built up chiefly by Germans. A post office was established at Arneckeville in 1872, and remained in operation until 1954.

References

Unincorporated communities in DeWitt County, Texas
Unincorporated communities in Texas